Maurin is a surname, and may refer to:

 Antoine Maurin (1771–1830), French cavalry commander.
 Antoine Maurin (1793–1860), French lithographer.
 Charles Maurin (1856–1914), French painter, engraver, and an anarchist.
 Eva Maurin (1993), French artistic gymnast.
 Joaquín Maurín (1896–1973), Spanish Communist politician.
 José Manuel García Maurin (1997), Spanish soccer player.
 Julien Maurin (1985), French rally driver.
 Louis Maurin (1869–1956), French army general who was twice Minister of War.
 Louis-Joseph Maurin (1859–1936), Roman Catholic Cardinal and Archbishop of Lyon.
 Mado Maurin (1915–2013), French stage actress.
 Patrick Maurin (1947–1982), former stage name of French actor Patrick Dewaere.
 Peter Maurin (1877–1949), Catholic social activist.
 Rene Maurin (born 1971), Slovene theatre director, film director and screenwriter.
 Ty Maurin (1982), former American soccer player.